The House at 19 Tremont Street is the smallest extant 19th century worker's cottage in Stoneham, Massachusetts.  Built c. 1850, it is a stylistically vernacular single-story wood-frame structure, four bays wide, with a side gable roof, clapboard siding, and a brick foundation.  Its only significant decorative features is its entry, which has sidelight windows typical of the Greek Revival period.  It is the best surviving example of what was once a row of worker cottages that lined Tremont Street.

The house was listed on the National Register of Historic Places in 1984.

See also
National Register of Historic Places listings in Stoneham, Massachusetts
National Register of Historic Places listings in Middlesex County, Massachusetts

References

Houses on the National Register of Historic Places in Stoneham, Massachusetts
Houses in Stoneham, Massachusetts